Fenomeno (Greek: Φαινόμενο; English: Phainomeno) is a CD single by Greek singer Vasilis Karras. It was released in 1998 and gained platinum status. The two songs were also released on album "Epistrefo" the next year, in 1999.

Track listing
 "Fainomeno" - 3:27
 "Se eiha psila" - 4:02

Music and lyrics by Phoebus.

Personnel

Personnel
Phoebus-music, lyrics, arrangement, programming, keyboards, background vocals
Andreas Mouzakis-drums
Pavlos Diamantopoulos-electric bass
Giannis Bithikotsis-bouzouki, tzoura, baglama
Hakan-saz
Thanasis Vasilopoulos-clarinet, nei
Nikos Hatzopoulos-guitars (electric, 12-strings, acoustic)
Giorgos Roilos-percussion
Fedon Lionoudakis-accordion
Katerina Kiriakou, Alex Panayi, Christina Argiri-background vocals
Kostas Anagnostou-second vocals

Production
Achilleas Theofilou-production manager
Manolis Vlahos-sound, mix
Giorgos Stampolis, Alexandros Vourazelis, Vaggelis Siapatis - sound
Giorgos Stampolis-sound, computer editing
Thodoris Chrisanthopoulos-digital mastering (Fabelsound)
Giannis Sarlis-artwork

Credits adapted from the album's liner notes.

References

Vasilis Karras songs
1998 songs
Songs written by Phoebus (songwriter)
Minos EMI singles